Beaopterus is a genus of kelp fly in the family Coelopidae.

Species
Beaopterus philpotti (Malloch, 1933)
Beaopterus robustus Lamb, 1909

References

Coelopidae
Sciomyzoidea genera